The 1995–96 Eliteserien season was the 57th season of ice hockey in Norway. Eight teams participated in the league, and Storhamar Ishockey won the championship.

Regular season

Playoff Qualification

Group A

Group B

Playoffs

Relegation

Gruppe A

Group B

External links
Season on hockeyarchives.info

Norway
GET-ligaen seasons
GET